The Far West region of New South Wales, Australia refers generally to the western part of the state, which is too dry to support wheat or other crops or intensive pastoral endeavours.  It is west of the North West Slopes, Central West and the Riverina.  It is an area with limited rainfall, and the only major rivers found in it are the Darling River and the Murray River (on its southern edge), which originate in the Great Dividing Range to the east.  The region corresponds to the combination of the Australian Bureau of Meteorology's forecast areas of Upper Western and Lower Western.   It also corresponds to the Western Division established under the New South Wales Western Lands Act 1901.

Its only city is Broken Hill, and other significant towns are Bourke, Brewarrina, Cobar, Ivanhoe and Wentworth.

Ninety-five per cent of the region is uncleared. The major industries are mining and extensive pasturing. During good seasons in the 1870s and 1880s, large sheep stations were established with high stocking rates, partly in response to a widespread belief that the introduction of European agriculture would cause climate change in favour of European conditions.  This 'rain follows the plough' myth was shattered by the droughts of the 1890s, and many of the stations established during this period were subsequently abandoned.

The Far West region is traversed by the Barrier Highway, the Silver City Highway, the Mitchell Highway, the Cobb Highway and the Sturt Highway and by the Sydney-Perth Railway.

Notes

References

 
Regions of New South Wales
Murray-Darling basin